Damirchi (also Romanized as Damīrchī) is a village in Alan Baraghush Rural District, Mehraban District, Sarab County, East Azerbaijan Province, Iran. At the 2006 census, its population was 429, in 82 families.

References 

Populated places in Sarab County